Carel Frederick Kirstein Greeff (born 20 May 1990) is a South African rugby union player, currently playing with Italian Top12 side Rugby Rovigo Delta. His regular position is loose-forward.

Career

Youth
His performances in the latter also resulted in his inclusion in an Under-18 South African Elite squad in 2008.

MTN Golden Lions
He never appeared in the competition proper, instead representing the  team in the 2011 Under-21 Provincial Championship competition, making twelve appearances.

Varsity Cup Rugby

GWK Griquas
He then joined  before the 2013 Currie Cup Premier Division. He scored a try in injury time to tie the score 30–30 and a Nico Scheepers conversion gave  a dramatic victory.

Toyota Free State Cheetahs
In 2014, Greeff was included in the  squad for the 2014 Super Rugby season.

Steval Pumas
Greeff signed a two-year contract with Port Elizabeth-based Super Rugby side the  prior to the 2016 season.

Toscana Aeroporti I Medicei
Greeff moved to Italy to join National Championship of Excellence side I Medicei in 2017.

He played a total of 52 games and scored 75 points for I Medicei in 3 full seasons.

Rugby Rovigo Delta

In 2020, Greeff signed a two-year contract with the Top12 side to officially join Rugby Rovigo Delta. In 2021 Carel Greeff scored the final tries in the Semi-Final and Final to secure a dramatic 13th Italian National Championship for Rugby Rovigo Delta. At the end of the 2022 rugby Season Carel retired from professional rugby

References

South African rugby union players
Living people
1990 births
Rugby union players from Klerksdorp
Golden Lions players
Griquas (rugby union) players
Cheetahs (rugby union) players
Rugby union flankers
Rugby union number eights
South African expatriate sportspeople in Italy
South African expatriate rugby union players
Rugby Club I Medicei players
Rugby Rovigo Delta players
Pumas (Currie Cup) players
University of the Witwatersrand alumni
Expatriate rugby union players in Italy